Kelly M. Chambers (née Smith, born 1975 or 1976) is an American businesswoman and politician.

Education 
Chambers graduated from Pacific Lutheran University.

Career 
As a business woman, Chambers is the co-owner of the local franchise for in-home senior aide provider Visiting Angels.

Chambers is a state representative in the Washington State legislature, representing the 25th Legislative District. She was first elected in 2018, defeating Jamie Smith by more than 1,100 votes.

Personal life 
Chambers, a graduate of Pacific Lutheran University, is married to Jeff Chambers. They have three children: Ashton, Savanna, and Nick.

References

External links 
 Representative Kelly Chambers at houserepublicans.WA.gov

1970s births
Year of birth uncertain
Living people
Republican Party members of the Washington House of Representatives
Women state legislators in Washington (state)
21st-century American politicians
21st-century American women politicians